Ladin is a Romance language of the Rhaeto-Romance subgroup,  mainly spoken in the Dolomite Mountains in Northern Italy in the provinces of South Tyrol, Trentino, and Belluno, by the Ladin people. It exhibits similarities to Swiss Romansh and Friulian.

The precise extension of the Ladin language area is a subject of scholarly debate. A more narrow perspective includes only the dialects of the valleys around the Sella group, while wider definitions comprise the dialects of adjacent valleys in the Province of Belluno and even dialects spoken in the northwestern Trentino.

A standard variety of Ladin has been developed by the Office for Ladin Language Planning as a common communication tool across the whole Ladin-speaking region.

Geographic distribution
 
Ladin is recognized as a minority language in 54 Italian municipalities belonging to the provinces of South Tyrol, Trentino and Belluno. It is not possible to assess the exact number of Ladin speakers, because only in the provinces of South Tyrol and Trentino are the inhabitants asked to identify their native language in the general census of the population, which takes place every 10 years.

South Tyrol 
In the 2011 census, 20,548 inhabitants of South Tyrol declared Ladin as their native language. Ladin is an officially recognised language, taught in schools and used in public offices (in written as well as spoken forms).

The following municipalities of South Tyrol have a majority of Ladin speakers:

Trentino 
In the 2011 census, 18,550 inhabitants of Trentino declared Ladin as their native language. It is prevailing in the following municipalities of Trentino in the Fassa Valley, where Ladin is recognized as a minority language:

The Nones language in the Non Valley and the related Solandro language found in the Sole Valley are Gallo-Romance languages and often grouped together into a single linguistic unit due to their similarity. They are spoken in 38 municipalities but have no official status. Their more precise classification is uncertain. Both dialects show a strong resemblance to Trentinian dialect and Eastern Lombard, and scholars debate whether they are Ladin dialects or not.

About 23% of the inhabitants from Val di Non and 1.5% from Val di Sole declared Ladin as their native language at the 2011 census. The number of Ladin speakers in those valleys amounts to 8,730, outnumbering the native speakers in the Fassa Valley. In order to stress the difference between the dialects in Non and Fassa valleys, it has been proposed to distinguish between ladins dolomitiches (Dolomitic Ladinians) and ladins nonejes (Non Valley Ladinians) at the next census.

Province of Belluno 
There is no linguistic census in the Province of Belluno, but the number of Ladin speakers has been estimated using a 2006 survey. In this area, there are about 1,166 people who speak the standard Ladin and 865 who speak the dialect of Ladin, so out of 8,495 inhabitants they are the 23.9%. They live in the part of the province that was part of the County of Tyrol until 1918, comprising the communes of Cortina d'Ampezzo (15.6% Ladin), Colle Santa Lucia (50.6% Ladin) and Livinallongo del Col di Lana (54.3% Ladin).

The provincial administration of Belluno has enacted to identify Ladin as a minority language in additional municipalities. Those are: Agordo, Alleghe, Auronzo di Cadore, Borca di Cadore, Calalzo di Cadore, Canale d'Agordo, Cencenighe Agordino, Cibiana di Cadore, Comelico Superiore, Danta di Cadore, Domegge di Cadore, Falcade, Forno di Zoldo, Gosaldo, La Valle Agordina, Lozzo di Cadore, Ospitale di Cadore, Perarolo di Cadore, Pieve di Cadore, Rivamonte Agordino, Rocca Pietore, San Nicolò di Comelico, San Pietro di Cadore, San Tomaso Agordino, San Vito di Cadore, Santo Stefano di Cadore, Selva di Cadore, Taibon Agordino, Vallada Agordina, Valle di Cadore, Vigo di Cadore, Vodo di Cadore, Voltago Agordino, Zoldo Alto, Zoppè di Cadore. Ladinity in the province of Belluno is more ethnic than linguistic. The varieties spoken by Ladin municipalities are Venetian alpine dialects, which are grammatically no different to those spoken in municipalities that did not declare themselves as Ladin. Their language is called Ladino Bellunese.

All Ladin dialects spoken in the province of Belluno, including those in the former Tyrolean territories, enjoy a varying degree of influence from Venetian.

History

The name derives from Latin, because Ladin is originally a Vulgar Latin language left over from the Romanized Alps. Ladin is often attributed to be a relic of Vulgar Latin dialects associated with Rhaeto-Romance languages. Whether a proto-Rhaeto-Romance language ever existed is controversially discussed amongst linguists and historians, a debate known as Questione Ladina. Starting in the 6th century, the Bavarii started moving in from the north, while from the south Gallo-Italic languages started pushing in, which further shrank the original extent of the Ladin area. Only in the more remote mountain valleys did Ladin survive among the isolated populations.

Starting in the very early Middle Ages, the area was mostly ruled by the County of Tyrol or the Bishopric of Brixen, both belonging to the realms of the Austrian Habsburg rulers. The area of Cadore was under the rule of the Republic of Venice. During the period of the Holy Roman Empire of the German Nation and, after 1804, the Austrian Empire, the Ladins underwent a process of Germanization.

After the end of World War I in 1918, Italy annexed the southern part of Tyrol, including the Ladin areas. The Italian nationalist movement of the 19th and 20th centuries regarded Ladin as an "Italian dialect", a notion rejected by various Ladin exponents and associations, despite their having been counted as Italians by the Austrian authorities as well. The programme of Italianization, professed by fascists such as Ettore Tolomei and Benito Mussolini, added further pressure on the Ladin communities to subordinate their identities to Italian. This included changing Ladin place names into the Italian pronunciation according to Tolomei's Prontuario dei nomi locali dell'Alto Adige.

Following the end of World War II, the Gruber-De Gasperi Agreement of 1946 between Austria and Italy introduced a level of autonomy for Trentino and South Tyrol but did not include any provisions for the Ladin language. Only in the second autonomy statute for South Tyrol in 1972 was Ladin recognized as a partially official language.

Status

Ladin is officially recognised in Trentino and South Tyrol by provincial and national law. Italy signed the European Charter for Regional or Minority Languages of 1991, but it has not ratified it so far. The charter calls for minority rights to be respected and minority languages, to which Ladin belongs, to be appropriately protected and promoted. Starting in the 1990s, the Italian parliament and provincial assembly have passed laws and regulations protecting the Ladin language and culture. A cultural institute was founded to safeguard and educate in the language and culture. School curricula were adapted in order to teach in Ladin, and street signs are being changed to bilingual.

Ladin is also recognized as a protected language in the Province of Belluno in Veneto region pursuant to the Standards for Protection of Historic Language Minorities Act No. 482 (1999). In comparison with South Tyrol and Trentino, the wishes of the Ladins have barely been addressed by the regional government. In a popular referendum in October 2007, the inhabitants of Cortina d'Ampezzo overwhelmingly voted to leave Veneto and return to South Tyrol. The redrawing of the provincial borders would return Cortina d'Ampezzo, Livinallongo del Col di Lana and Colle Santa Lucia to South Tyrol, to which they traditionally belonged when part of the County of Tyrol or the Bishopric of Brixen.

Although the Ladin communities are spread out over three neighbouring regions, the Union Generala di Ladins dles Dolomites is asking that they be reunited. The Ladin Autonomist Union and the Fassa Association run on a Ladin list and have sought more rights and autonomy for Ladin speakers. Ladins are also guaranteed political representations in the assemblies of Trentino and South Tyrol due to a reserved seats system.

In South Tyrol, in order to reach a fair allocation of jobs in public service, a system called "ethnic proportion" was established in the 1970s. Every 10 years, when the general census of population takes place, each citizen has to identify with a linguistic group. The results determine how many potential positions in public service are allocated for each linguistic group. This has theoretically enabled Ladins to receive guaranteed representation in the South Tyrolean civil service according to their numbers.

The recognition of minority languages in Italy has been criticised since the implementation of Act No. 482 (1999), especially due to alleged financial benefits. This applies also to the Ladin language, especially in the province of Belluno.

Subdivisions
A possible subdivision of Ladin language identifies six major groups.

Athesian Group of the Sella
The dialects of the Athesian group (from the river Adige Basin) of the Sella are spoken in South Tyrol:
 Gherdëina, spoken in Val Gardena by 8,148 inhabitants (80–90% of the population);
 Badiot and Maró, spoken in Val Badia and in Mareo by 9,229 people, i.e. 95%, as native language.

The South Tyrolean dialects are most similar to the original Ladin.

Trentinian Group of the Sella
The names of the Ladin dialects spoken in the Fassa Valley in Trentino are Moenat, Brach, and Cazet. 82.8% of the inhabitants of Fassa Valley are native Ladin speakers; the Ladin language in Fassa is influenced by Trentinian dialects.

Agordino Group of the Sella
In the Province of Belluno the following dialects are considered as part of the Agordino group:
Fodom, also called Livinallese, spoken in Livinallongo del Col di Lana and Colle Santa Lucia, native language of 80–90% of the people;
Rocchesano in the area of Rocca Pietore. While Laste di Sopra (Ladin Laste de Sora) and Sottoguda (Ladin Stagùda) are predominantly Ladin, in Alleghe, San Tomaso, and Falcade so-called Ladin-Venetian dialects are spoken, with strong Venetian influence;
 Ladin in the area of Agordo and Valle del Biois, even if some regard it rather as Venetian-Ladin.

Ampezzan Group
Spoken in Cortina d'Ampezzo (Anpezo), similar to Cadorino dialect.

Even in Valle di Zoldo (from Forno-Fôr upwards) there are elements of the Ampezzan Group.

Cadorino Group
Spoken in Cadore and Comelico and best known as Cadorino dialect.

Nones and Solandro Group
In Western Trentino, in Non Valley, Val di Sole, Val di Peio, Val di Rabbi, and part of Val Rendena, detached from the dolomitic area, dialects are spoken that are often considered to be part of the Ladin language (Anaunic Ladin), but enjoy strong influences from Trentinian and Eastern Lombard dialects.

Sample texts

Lord's Prayer
The first part of the 'Lord's Prayer' in Standard Ladin, Latin, and Italian for comparison, as well as other Romance languages and English:

Common phrases

Phonology

An  vowel, spelled , as in Urtijëi, and two front rounded vowels [, ], spelled , occur in some local dialects but are not a part of Standard Ladin.

See also 

 Ladin Wikipedia
History of the Alps
 Romance languages

References

Further reading

 Rut Bernardi, Curs de gherdëina – Trëdesc lezions per mparé la rujeneda de Gherdëina/Dreizehn Lektionen zur Erlernung der grödnerischen Sprache. St. Martin in Thurn: Istitut Ladin Micurà de Rü, 1999, 
 Vittorio Dell'Aquila, Gabriele Iannàccaro, Survey Ladins: Usi linguistici nelle Valli Ladine. Trient: Autonome Region Trentino-Südtirol, 2006, 
 Marco Forni: Wörterbuch Deutsch–Grödner-Ladinisch. Vocabuler tudësch–ladin de Gherdëina. Istitut Ladin Micurà de Rü, St. Martin in Thurn 2002, 
 Günter Holtus, Michael Metzeltin, Christian Schmitt, eds., Lexikon der Romanistischen Linguistik (LRL), 12 vols. Tübingen: Niemeyer, 1988–2005; vol. 3: Die einzelnen romanischen Sprachen und Sprachgebiete von der Renaissance bis zur Gegenwart. Rumänisch, Dalmatisch / Istroromanisch, Friaulisch, Ladinisch, Bündnerromanisch, 1989.
 Theodor Gartner, Ladinische Wörter aus den Dolomitentälern. Halle: Niemeyer, 1913 (Online version)
 Maria Giacin Chiades, ed., Lingua e cultura ladina. Treviso: Canova, 2004, 
 Constanze Kindel, "Ladinisch für Anfänger", Die Zeit 4 (2006) (Online version)
 Heinrich Schmid, Wegleitung für den Aufbau einer gemeinsamen Schriftsprache der Dolomitenladiner. St. Martin in Thurn: Istitut Cultural Ladin Micurà de Rü & San Giovanni: Istitut Cultural Ladin Majon di Fascegn, 1994 (Online version)
 Giampaolo Salvo, "Ladin", in The Oxford Guide to the Romance Languages, eds. Adam Ledgeway & Martin Maiden. Oxford: Oxford University Press, 2016, pp. 154–68.
 Servisc de Planificazion y Elaborazion dl Lingaz Ladin (SPELL), Gramatica dl Ladin Standard. St. Martin in Thurn, Istitut Cultural Ladin Micurà de Rü, 2001,  (https://web.archive.org/web/20110514122102/http://www.spell-termles.ladinia.net/documents/gramatica_LS_2001.pdf Online version)

External links

The office for Ladin language planning
Rai Ladinia – Newscasts and broadcasts from public broadcaster Rai Sender Bozen.
Noeles.info – News portal in Ladin.
Weekly Paper – La Usc Di Ladins (The Voice of the Ladins, in Ladin).
Ladinienatlas ALD-I
Linguistic Atlas of Dolomitic Ladinian and neighbouring Dialects – Speaking Linguistic Atlas
Grzega, Joachim,  Ku-eichstaett.de, Materialien zu einem etymologischen Wörterbuch des Dolomitenladinischen (MEWD), Katholische Universität Eichstätt-Ingolstadt (KU) 2005.
Italian-Fassano Ladin Dictionary
Italian-Cadorino Ladin Dictionary
Italian-Cadorino Ladin Dictionary
Italian-Gardenese Ladin Dictionary
Italian-Badiotto Ladin Dictionary
German-Gardenese Ladin Dictionary
German-Badiotto Ladin Dictionary
Ladin basic lexicon at the Global Lexicostatistical Database
Declaration of language group affiliation in South Tyrol – Population Census 2001

 
Languages of Italy